Mounira Al Solh (born 1978 in Beirut) is a Lebanese-Dutch visual artist.

Life and education 
In 1989, during the Lebanese Civil War, Mounira Al Solhs family left Beirut and emigrated to Damascus in Syria. Al Solh studied painting at the Lebanese University in Beirut (1998 until 2001) and Fine Arts at the Gerrit Rietveld Academie in Amsterdam (2003–2006), and was a resident at the Rijksakademie van beeldende kunsten in Amsterdam (2007–2008). She lives and works in Beirut and Amsterdam.

Work 
Al Solh creates artworks on paper, performances, embroidery and film works about the topics of trauma, loss, migration and memory, inspired by the ongoing conflict situation in the Middle East. She treats these topics in a fictional, not documentary way. 

She had solo exhibitions at (among others) BALTIC Centre for Contemporary Art (2022), Art Institute of Chicago (2018), and Centre for Contemporary Art, Glasgow (2013). She participated in documenta 14 (Athens and Kassel, 2017) and the 56th Venice Bienniale (2015). 

In 2009, Al Solh was nominated for the Volkskrant Beeldende Kunst Prijs, and in 2015 for the Abraaj Group Art Prize.

External link 

 https://www.mouniraalsolh.com/ - official website
 Video interview by Hollandse Meesters

References 

1978 births
Lebanese artists
Living people